The Bahamian Parliament Building is the home of the Parliament of the Bahamas. The building was constructed in 1815 and is located in the capital of Nassau.

A statue of Queen Victoria stands in Parliament Square.

References 

Colonial architecture
Seats of national legislatures
Buildings and structures in Nassau, Bahamas
Government buildings completed in 1815